Zinc chromate, ZnCrO4, is a chemical compound containing the chromate anion, appearing as odorless yellow powder or yellow-green crystals, but, when used for coatings, pigments are often added. It is used industrially in chromate conversion coatings, having been developed by the Ford Motor Company in the 1920s.

Production

A process known as the Cronak process is used to create zinc chromate for use in industry.  This process is done by putting zinc or a zinc plated metal in a solution of sodium dichromate and sulfuric acid for a few seconds. Zinc chromate can also be synthesized by using neutral potassium chromate (K2CrO4) and zinc sulfate (ZnSO4), which forms a precipitate.

K2CrO4 + ZnSO4 → ZnCrO4 + K2SO4

Uses

Zinc chromate's main use is in industrial painting as a coating over iron or aluminum materials. It was used extensively on aircraft by the US military, especially during the 1930s and 1940s. It is also used in a variety of paint coatings for the aerospace and automotive industries. Its use as a corrosion-resistant agent was applied to aluminium alloy parts first in commercial aircraft, and then in military ones. During the 1940 and 1950s it was typically found as the "paint" in the wheel wells of retractable landing gear on US military aircraft to protect the aluminium from corrosion.  This compound was a useful coating because it is an anti-corrosive and anti-rust primer. Since it is highly toxic, it also destroys organic growth on the surface.  Zinc chromate is also used in spray paints, artists' paints, pigments in varnishes, and in making linoleum.

When used as a pigment, it is known as Zinc Yellow, Buttercup Yellow or Yellow 36. It is rarely used in art because the pigment degenerates into a brown color. This effect can be seen in Georges Seurat's famous painting A Sunday Afternoon on the Island of La Grande Jatte. The degradation of zinc yellow in Seurat's painting was thoroughly investigated and these findings were subsequently employed in a digital rejuvenation of the painting.

Zinc chromate putty was used as sealant in addition to two O-rings between sections of the failed solid rocket booster on Space Shuttle Challenger. Blowholes in this putty may have been a minor contributor to its catastrophic loss.

Toxicity

Recent studies have shown that not only is zinc chromate highly toxic, it is also a carcinogen. Exposure to zinc chromate can cause tissue ulceration and cancer. A study published in the British Journal of Industrial Medicine showed a significant correlation between the use of zinc chromate and lead chromate in factories and the number of cases in lung cancer experienced by the workers. Because of its toxicity the use of zinc chromate has greatly diminished in recent years.

References

chromate
zinc